This is a list of episodes from the OLN adventure travel television series Departures. The list is ordered by the chronology of the air date.

Episodes

Season 1

Season 2

Season 3

References

Departures